The High Court of Yangon Region serves as the regional high court of Yangon Region. The High Court was established under the Union Judiciary Law of 2010, in accordance with section 443 of the Constitution of Myanmar. The High Court resides in the High Court Building, an iconic colonial-era building in Kyauktada Township.

In February 2010, Win Swe, a director of the criminal justice department of the Yangon Division High Court, was appointed the Chief Justice of the High Court by the Yangon Region Hluttaw.

References

Judiciary of Myanmar
Subnational supreme courts
2010 establishments in Myanmar
Courts and tribunals established in 2010